Vater Morgana is a 2010 German comedy film by director Till Endemann with the actors Christian Ulmen, Michael Gwisdek and Felicitas Woll in the central characters – produced by the movie Company and Warner Bros. Film Productions Germany, released by Warner Bros.

Plot 
Lutz is actually happy with his life and wants to propose to his girlfriend Annette, but suddenly his father Walther emerges. Always when he surfaced in Lutz' life, he played havoc and just made problems. And also now, he confuse everything and unfortunately Lutz has to notice, that his father has Alzheimer's.

Cast 
 Christian Ulmen as Lutz Stielike
 Michael Gwisdek as Walther Stielike
 Felicitas Woll as Annette Diercks
 Marc Hosemann as Lothar Rehberg
 Ulrike Krumbiegel as Britta
 Michael Lott as Holger
 Heinz Hoenig as Guenther Diercks
 Hans Peter Hallwachs as Edgar Moebius
 Aykut Kayacik as Fazeli
 Friederike Kempter as Kerstin
 Hans Werner Olm as Spliss
 Annalena Schmidt as Frau Dr. Beer
 Alexander Stamm as Axel
 Kyra Mladeck as Frau von Markwirtz
 Hans-Peter Korff as Juwelier Jensen
 Harald Maack as Eberhard

Production 
The principal filmings was in August and September 2009 in Hamburg, Germany. The producer, Douglas Welbat, also produced 7 Dwarves – Men Alone in the Wood.

External links 
 

2010 films
2010s German-language films
2010 comedy films
German comedy films
Films about Alzheimer's disease
Warner Bros. films
2010s German films